Hriday Shetty is an Indian film director. He is the son of stuntman M. B. Shetty and the half-brother of film director and producer Rohit Shetty.

Personal life
He was born to Vinodini and veteran actor/stuntman M. B. Shetty (popularly known as Fighter Shetty) who had acted in Hindi and Kannada films.

Career
He started his career as an associate director during Parasmani which released in 1992. His work as a filmmaker includes the films Chaalis Chauraasi, Godfather: The Legend Continues, Pyaar Mein Twist, Daag - Shades of Love, Plan. Chaalis Chauraasi was produced by his brother Uday Shetty.

Filmography
Chaalis Chauraasi (2012)
Godfather: The Legend Continues (2007) (Pakistani film)
Pyaar Mein Twist (2005)
Daag - Shades of Love (2004)
Plan (2004)
Parasmani (1992) (associate director)

References

External links

Living people
21st-century Indian film directors
Mangaloreans
Film directors from Mumbai
Hindi-language film directors
Year of birth missing (living people)